State Highway 37 is a state highway in the Indian state of Andhra Pradesh.

Route 

It starts at Parvathipuram and passes through Veeraghattam, Palakonda, Singupuram and ends at Kalingapatnam.

Junctions and interchanges

See also 
 List of State Highways in Andhra Pradesh

References 

State Highways in Andhra Pradesh
Roads in Vizianagaram district
Roads in Srikakulam district